Zvíkovec is a market town in Rokycany District in the Plzeň Region of the Czech Republic. It has about 200 inhabitants.

References

Populated places in Rokycany District
Market towns in the Czech Republic